The United States Environmental Protection Agency (EPA) maintains test methods, which are approved procedures for measuring the presence and concentration of physical, chemical and biological contaminants; evaluating properties, such as toxic properties, of chemical substances; or measuring the effects of substances under various conditions. The methods in the Agency index are known as EPA Methods. There are other types of methods such as the ASTM and United States Pharmacopeia, but the EPA Methods are the most widely accepted and used.

Nomenclature
The method numbers generally range from 1 to 9000 and may have modification letters appended to the end, signifying a newer version of the method has been released. Some ranges of numbers appear to be organized with intention, for example methods 1-99 being air methods or the 7000s being for hazardous waste. Others number ranges, however, seem to only contain random methods, like the 300 and 400 series both being for wet chemistry methods.

Searchable databases
Since the EPA methods are created by different regulatory departments within the EPA, finding methods on the EPA website itself can be challenging. To make finding methods easier, some organizations have created method search databases that organize all the methods into one place and link to actual test methods. Some allow searching by method number, analyte, or other keywords in the method.

See also
 Analytical chemistry

References

External links
EPA Hazardous Waste Test Methods
EPA Air Emission Methods with Links
Clean Water Act Analytical Methods
Drinking Water Analytical Methods

Analytical chemistry
Methods